Dávid Kelemen (born 24 May 1992) is a Hungarian football player who plays for Romanian club FK Csíkszereda.

Club statistics

Updated to games played as of 8 February 2022.

External links
Profile at HLSZ 
Profile at MLSZ 
Dávid Kelemen at Soccerway

1992 births
Living people
People from Békéscsaba
Hungarian footballers
Association football defenders
MTK Budapest FC players
Hapoel Tel Aviv F.C. players
Paksi FC players
Békéscsaba 1912 Előre footballers
Nyíregyháza Spartacus FC players
Vasas SC players
Szombathelyi Haladás footballers
FK Csíkszereda Miercurea Ciuc players
Nemzeti Bajnokság I players
Israeli Premier League players
Liga II players
Expatriate footballers in Israel
Expatriate footballers in Romania
Hungarian expatriate sportspeople in Israel
Hungarian expatriate sportspeople in Romania
Sportspeople from Békés County